Qarleq-e Bozorg (also Romanized as Qārleq-e Bozorg; also known as Qālnk, Qālūk, Qārleq, and Qārloq) is a village in Gowdin Rural District, in the Central District of Kangavar County, Kermanshah Province, Iran. At the 2006 census, its population was 1,919, in 493 families.

References 

Populated places in Kangavar County